Gretchen Rau (July 6, 1939 – March 29, 2006) was a professional property master, set decorator, and art director in the American film industry. Her more notable projects include the films Crocodile Dundee, A River Runs Through It, The Crucible, and The Life Aquatic with Steve Zissou.

Additionally, she won an Academy Award for set decoration for Memoirs of a Geisha, and was nominated for The Last Samurai and posthumously for The Good Shepherd.

Born in New Orleans, she lived most of her life in Northport, Long Island, New York until her death in 2006 from brain cancer, aged 66.

References

External links
 

Deaths from brain cancer in the United States
Best Art Direction Academy Award winners
Deaths from cancer in New York (state)
American art directors
American set decorators
Artists from New Orleans
People from Northport, New York
1939 births
2006 deaths